Zook House may refer to:

Jacob Zook House, Exton, Pennsylvania, listed on the National Register of Historic Places in Chester County, Pennsylvania
Zook House (West Whiteland Township, Pennsylvania), listed on the National Register of Historic Places in Chester County, Pennsylvania

See also
Zook's Mill Covered Bridge, Brownstown, Pennsylvania, in Lancaster County